Andres Ilmar Kasekamp (born 7 December 1966 in Toronto) is the director of the Estonian Foreign Policy Institute (:et) (since 2000) and Professor of Baltic Politics at the University of Tartu, Estonia (since 2004).

Andres Kasekamp served as chairman of the Board of the Open Estonia Foundation from 2004 to 2008. His main research interests are extreme-right movements and contemporary Baltic history.

He graduated from the University of Toronto. In 1996 he earned a PhD in history from the School of Slavonic and East European Studies in London, which today forms part of University College London. He has been a Visiting Professor at the University of Toronto and Humboldt University, Berlin. In 2002-2005 he was the editor of the Journal of Baltic Studies.

His book The Radical Right in Interwar Estonia is the first comprehensive book on the Estonian politics of the 1930s. It mainly focuses on the history of the Estonian War of Independence Veterans' League.

In 2010, he published A History of the Baltic States for Palgrave Macmillan.

Publications
 The Radical Right in Interwar Estonia (2000) 
 With Sæter, M. (2003). Estonian Membership in the EU: Security and Foreign Policy Aspects. Oslo: Norwegian Institute of International Affairs
 Kasekamp, A. (2004). Political Change in Estonia during the 1990s. Vainio-Korhonen, Kirsi; Lahtinen, Anu (eds.) History and Change. Helsinki: Suomalaisen Kirjallisuuden Seura
 Kasekamp, A. (2006). Estonia, Finland, Latvia, Lithuania. In Blamires, Cyprian (ed.). World Fascism: A Historical Encyclopedia. Santa Barbara: ABC-CLIO
 A History of the Baltic States. London and New York: Palgrave Macmillan, 2010.

References

External links
Biography of Andres Kasekamp at Estonian Foreign Policy Institute
Kasekamp's CV at Estonian Science Portal ETIS

21st-century Estonian historians
Canadian people of Estonian descent
Living people
Alumni of University College London
Alumni of the UCL School of Slavonic and East European Studies
1966 births
Historians of Estonia
Writers from Toronto